Probable ATP-dependent RNA helicase DDX43 is an enzyme that in humans is encoded by the DDX43 gene.

Function 

The protein encoded by this gene is an ATP-dependent RNA helicase in the DEAD box family and displays tumor-specific expression.

References

Further reading